The Almbach is a river of the state Salzburg, Austria.

The Almbach is approx.  long. It is the drain of the lake . In its middle course it is dammed by the reservoir . The river flows into the Salzach at Hallein.

References

Rivers of Salzburg (state)
Hallein
Rivers of Austria